Marilyn Moore (1930–1992) was an American jazz singer.

Marilyn Moore may also refer to:

 Marilyn Moore, 1977 victim of serial killer Peter Sutcliffe
 Marilyn Moore (artist), American basket maker
 Marilyn Moore (politician) (born 1948), Connecticut State Senator